This is a timeline of women in Denmark, noting important events in Danish women's history.´

Timeline

14th century
 10 August 1387 –Margaret I of Denmark becomes the first woman to rule Denmark as a monarch: the first woman to rule Denmark was Margaret Sambiria as a regent in 1259.

17th century
 27 December 1675 – Abel Cathrines Stiftelse is founded by Abel Cathrine von der Wisch.

19th century
 24 February 1871 – The Danish Women's Society (Dansk Kvindesamfund) is founded by Matilde Bajer and her husband Fredrik Bajer.
 1 October 1872 – Kvindelig Læseforening is founded at the initiative of Sophie Petersen.
 1875 – The University of Copenhagen is opened to women students.
 1885 –Nielsine Nielsen becomes the first woman with a medical degree in Demark.
 1988 – The first women are accepted as students at the Royal Danish Academy of Fine Arts.
 1890 – The Women's Council of Denmark is established.
 1895 – The Nordic Women's Exhibition (Kvindernes Udstilling fra Fortid og Nutid) takes place in Copenhagen.

20th century
 

 15 May – The Danish Housewives Association is founded.
 1918: Four Danish women are elected to the Folketing: Karen Ankersted, Mathilde Malling Hauschultz, Helga Larsen and Elna Munch. 
 1924 – Nina Bang becomes the first female minister in an internationally recognized government when she is appointed Minister for Education.
 1964 – KVINFO is founded.
 1970 – The Red Stocking Movement in Denmark is established in 1970; it is active until the mid-1980s. Inspired by the Redstockings founded in 1969 in New York City, it brings together left-wing feminists who fight for the same rights as men in terms of equal pay but it also addresses treatment of women in the workplace as well as in the family.

21st century
 3 October 2011 – Helle Thorning-Schmidt becomes the first woman prime minister of Denmark.
 30 September 2016 – Lone Træholt of the Royal Danish Air Force becomes Denmark's first woman general.
 11 September 2017 - Jette Albinus becomes the first woman in the Royal Danish Army to hold the rank of general.

References

Denmark
History of women in Denmark